Terrell Maiza Roberts (April 7, 1981  September 11, 2019) was an American football defensive back who played two seasons with the Cincinnati Bengals of the National Football League. He played college football at Oregon State University and attended El Cerrito High School in El Cerrito, California.

Professional career 

Roberts was signed by the Cincinnati Bengals on May 1, 2003 after going undrafted in the 2003 NFL Draft. He was released by the Bengals on October 4, 2005.

Death 
Roberts was fatally shot while visiting his grandmother in Richmond, California, on September 11, 2019.

References

External links 

 Just Sports Stats
 NFL Draft Scout

1981 births
2019 deaths
2019 murders in the United States
Players of American football from Berkeley, California
American football defensive backs
African-American players of American football
Oregon State Beavers football players
Cincinnati Bengals players
Deaths by firearm in California
20th-century African-American people
21st-century African-American sportspeople